The CEPSUM  is a multi-purpose complex sport centre located on the campus of the Université de Montréal in Montreal, Quebec, Canada. The CEPSUM hosts the Montreal Carabins teams.

History
In 1963-1964, the Université de Montréal purchased the building belonging to the Young Men's and Young Women's Hebrew Association, situated on the corner of Park Avenue and Mount Royal Avenue. The Centre at that time had a swimming pool, a gymnasium, a palestre, and an auditorium. The Montreal Carabins of this period used the outside installations of the Jeanne-Mance Park. The Physical educational Department and the Carabins occupied these places until 1976, year of the official inauguration of the CEPSUM which was built for the Montreal Olympics.

The CEPSUM hosted the fencing and the fencing part of the modern pentathlon events during the 1976 Summer Olympics. Following the Olympics, the CEPSUM became the sport centre for the Université de Montréal. In 2004, after almost 30 years of use, important renovation work took place (costing $12 million). These important renovations were completed at the beginning of 2011.

The CEPSUM also accommodates the Sports Medicine department and the clinic of kinesiology of the Université of Montréal.

Features
An Olympic swimming pool and a diving tank with springboards
An outdoor stadium of 5,100 seats with a soccer field or Canadian Football
An ice hockey arena of 2,460 seats (can be converted to a 5,000-seat amphitheatre) - also called Winter Stadium; home to the Montreal Carabins women's ice hockey
A triple gymnasium and simple volleyball gymnasiums
A large training room
A weight room for training
A sports hall containing a wall for rock climbing
A running track
A golf practice area
Several tennis courts
Several squash and racquetball courts
Multifunction rooms
Changing rooms
A palestre
Tunnel to Édouard-Montpetit station

References

External links
  (in French)

Sports venues in Montreal
Université de Montréal
Côte-des-Neiges–Notre-Dame-de-Grâce
Soccer venues in Montreal